The central northeastern dialect of Brazilian Portuguese is a dialect spoken in the central part of the Northeast Region, Brazil, in all the states of Rio Grande do Norte, Paraíba, Alagoas and Sergipe, much of the state of Pernambuco (except for the Zona da Mata and the Recife metropolitan area), north of Bahia, south of Ceará, southeastern of Piauí and a few regions of Maranhão. It has roughly about 53,078,137 native speakers and varies within the region. This dialect shares similarities between north coast, Baiano and Recifense dialects.

Main features
Predominant use of voiced (d̪) and voiceless (t̪) dental stops before close front unrounded vowel (i) even in final syllables "de" and "te", like presente  ("present") and diário  ("daily").
("Are you coming?") and Vai te embora! ("(You) Go away!").
In "des", "dis", "tes" or "tis" syllables, there are voiced alveolar sibilant affricate and voiceless alveolar sibilant affricate: idades  ("ages", "years") and partes  ("parts").
Voiced glottal fricative and voiceless glottal fricative are present in the sound of the letter "r" (the first between syllables, but never with an "r" starting a non-initial syllable alone, because these do , and the second at the beginning of words or digraph "rr"). None of the two phonemes occur at the end of words. Examples: corda  ("rope"), rabo  ("tail" - also locally in Brazilian Northeast "buttocks") and barragem  ("dam"), querer  ("to want").

IPA for Central northeastern Portuguese

This key also serves, for the most part, to the north coast and recifense dialects. But the dialects cited here do not have the phoneme /d͡z/ and /t͡s/, characteristic of the central northeastern dialect. Recifense dialect usually palatalizes fricatives in any syllabic consonant meeting (including the end of words) and not only before /d/ and /t/. Moreover, in certain regions of southeastern of Piauí and Maranhão west coast also a greater or lesser palatalization of fricatives may occur under the influence of Amazonian dialects (northern and Amazon Plateau), and even the absence of such palatalization. That is, in some areas the sound is pronounced exactly what is written (/s/ and /z/), and others as /ʃ/ and /ʒ/. In north coast dialect, also virtually no dental stops before /i/, /j/ or /ĩ/, and in its place they use postalveolar affricates (/d͡ʒ/ and /t͡ʃ/). In contrast, the central northeastern dialect has almost exclusive predominance of dental stops before /i/, /j/ or /ĩ/. And the postalveolar affricates are used only in the following cases: in words of foreign origin in the Portuguese language, especially English; in words denoting slang and regionalisms; and phonemes are present in the standard variety of Brazilian Portuguese, are also often in television media to replace the dental stops (though never in common parlance).

Consonants

1After the vowels /i/ or /ĩ/ and semivowel /j/.
2Used in plural words ending in "des", "dis", "tes" and "tis".
3Between the end and the beginning of syllables.
4At the beginning of words and the digraph "rr".
5Also in palatalization of /z/ before /d/.
6Phonetic junction between /k/ and /s/.
7Allophone of /l/ before /i/ and /ĩ/.
8Also in palatalization of /s/ before /t/.

Marginal phonemes

1 Only in words of foreign origin in the Portuguese language, in words denoting slang, regionalisms and optionally the grapheme "di" and "ti" that are in post-tonic syllables with rising diphthongs (and never in all locations, depending on local state changes to state where it is spoken dialect), and phonemes are present in the standard variety of Brazilian Portuguese, are also often in television media to replace the dental stops (though never in common parlance).

Vowels and semivowels

1Substitution for unstressed vowels /e/ and /o/.

References

Brazilian Portuguese